Allison Lynn Hartwell Eid (born January 1965) is a  United States circuit judge of the United States Court of Appeals for the Tenth Circuit. She previously served as an associate justice of the Colorado Supreme Court.

Early life and education
Born in Seattle and raised in Spokane, Washington by a single mother, Eid earned her Bachelor of Arts degree in American studies with distinction in 1987 from Stanford University, where she was a member of the Phi Beta Kappa honor society.   After graduating, she served as a Special Assistant and Speechwriter to President Ronald Reagan Secretary of Education, William Bennett.  She left the Department of Education to attend the University of Chicago Law School, where she was an articles editor of the University of Chicago Law Review. She graduated in 1991 with a Juris Doctor with high honors and was elected to the Order of the Coif.

Legal career
After graduating from law school, Eid served as a law clerk for Judge Jerry Edwin Smith of the United States Court of Appeals for the Fifth Circuit and then for justice Clarence Thomas of the Supreme Court of the United States.  After completing her clerkships, she went on to become a commercial and appellate litigator at the law firm of Arnold & Porter.  In 1998, she left Arnold & Porter to serve as an Associate Professor of Law at the University of Colorado Law School, where she taught courses on Constitutional law, torts, and federalism.

Colorado Solicitor General and Supreme Court of Colorado service
In 2002, President George W. Bush appointed Eid to serve on the Permanent Committee for the Oliver Wendell Holmes Devise, which writes the history of the U.S. Supreme Court and sponsors the Oliver Wendell Holmes Lecture.  In 2005, Republican Attorney General John Suthers appointed Eid to serve as Solicitor General of Colorado. A year later, Colorado Governor Bill Owens appointed Eid to serve as the 95th justice of the Colorado Supreme Court on February 15, 2006. She took office on March 13, 2006. In 2008, 75% of Colorado voters voted to retain Eid on the Supreme Court.

In May 2017, Eid found that imposing an eighty-four year sentence on a fifteen-year-old murderer did not violate the Constitution's Eighth Amendment prohibition on sentencing juveniles to life without parole because the punishment was styled as an aggregate term-of-years sentence. In May 2016, she was included on President Donald Trump's list of potential Supreme Court justices.

Federal judicial service
On June 7, 2017, President Donald Trump nominated Eid to serve as a United States Circuit Judge of the United States Court of Appeals for the Tenth Circuit, to the seat vacated by Judge Neil Gorsuch, who was elevated to the United States Supreme Court. On September 20, 2017, a hearing on her nomination was held before the Senate Judiciary Committee. On October 26, 2017, her nomination was reported out of committee by an 11–9 vote. On November 1, 2017, the United States Senate invoked cloture on her nomination by a 56–42 vote. On November 2, 2017, her nomination was confirmed by a 56–41 vote. She received her judicial commission the next day.

Personal life
Eid met her husband, Troy Eid, when he was standing in line at a Stanford University dorm cafeteria while she was working as a student food service worker and he was editor-in-chief of the student newspaper, The Stanford Daily; she later said: "It was love at first sight in the meal card line."  In 2006, a few months after Allison Eid was appointed to the Colorado Supreme Court, President George W. Bush appointed Troy Eid as the 41st United States Attorney for the District of Colorado and the first Egyptian-American U.S. Attorney in the country's history.  The Eids reside in Morrison, Colorado, with their son Alex and daughter Emily.

Electoral history 
2008

See also

List of justices of the Colorado Supreme Court
List of law clerks of the Supreme Court of the United States (Seat 10)
Donald Trump Supreme Court candidates

References

External links
 
 Biography at Tenth Circuit Court of Appeals
 
 
 Questionnaire for Judicial Nominees for the United States Senate Committee on the Judiciary	
 Contributor profile from the Federalist Society

|-

|-

1965 births
Living people
20th-century American women lawyers
20th-century American lawyers
21st-century American women lawyers
21st-century American lawyers
21st-century American judges
21st-century American women judges
Arnold & Porter people
Colorado lawyers
Justices of the Colorado Supreme Court
Federalist Society members
Judges of the United States Court of Appeals for the Tenth Circuit
Law clerks of the Supreme Court of the United States
Lawyers from Spokane, Washington
People from Morrison, Colorado
Politicians from Spokane, Washington
Solicitors General of Colorado
Stanford University alumni
United States court of appeals judges appointed by Donald Trump
University of Chicago Law School alumni
University of Colorado faculty
University of Colorado Law School faculty